The Immortal Life of Henrietta Lacks (2010) is a non-fiction book by American author Rebecca Skloot.  It was the 2011 winner of the National Academies Communication Award for best creative work that helps the public understanding of topics in science, engineering or medicine.

About
The book is about  Henrietta Lacks and the immortal cell line, known as HeLa, that came from Lacks's cervical cancer cells in 1951. Skloot became interested in Lacks after a biology teacher referenced her but knew little about her. Skloot began conducting extensive research on her and worked with Lacks' family to create the book. The book is notable for its science writing and dealing with ethical issues of race and class in medical research. Skloot said that some of the information was taken from the journal of Deborah Lacks, Henrietta Lacks's daughter, as well as from "archival photos and documents, scientific and historical research." It is Skloot's first book.

Editions
The book was initially released in hardcover, published by Crown, on February 2, 2010. On the same date, an audiobook edition was published by Random House Audio, narrated by Casandra Campbell and Bahni Turpin, as well as electronic editions in mobile (Kindle) and EPUB formats. A paperback edition was published by Broadway Books on March 8, 2011. It has also been translated into more than 25 foreign language editions.

Reception

Awards
The book was awarded the National Academies Best Book of the Year Award, the American Association for the Advancement of Science's Young Adult Science Book award, and the Wellcome Trust Book Prize, awarded annually to an outstanding work of fiction or non-fiction on the theme of health and medicine. It also won the Heartland Prize for non-fiction, among others, including a Salon Book Award, and a 100 New York Times Notable Books of the Year. The paperback edition had spent 75 weeks on the New York Times Best Seller list.

Critical reception
Critical reception was largely favorable. It was named a best book of the year by more than 60 media outlets, including New York Times, Oprah, NPR, and Entertainment Weekly. Lisa Margonelli reviewing in The New York Times Book Review said:

Dwight Garner of The New York Times wrote: 

One reviewer for The New Atlantis, while mostly positive about the book, questioned its ethical arguments about tissue markets and informed consent involving scientists such as Chester M. Southam, and claimed to have found factual errors: one related to the role of HeLa cells in early space missions, and, another related to a statement in the book that says "if all HeLa cells ever grown could have been gathered on a scale, their total weight would have measured more than 50 million metric tons." Skloot addresses this question on her website, where she explains how the 50 million metric tons figure was calculated, saying "That calculation was based on the way HeLa cells are known to divide (specifically how often they double their numbers) and the amount of time they’d been alive at the time the calculation was made." She clarifies that "it was a hypothetical calculation because that many cells couldn’t have been saved and put on a scale." She also says that the figures "were verified before the book went to press by the scientists who did the original calculations, and outside experts."

Academic reception
The book was adopted as a common reading text at more than 125 universities and was widely taught in high school, undergraduate, graduate and doctoral classrooms.

In September 2015, schools in Knox County, Tennessee were faced with demands from a parent that the book be removed from Knox County classrooms and libraries; the parent in question alleged that the scene in which Lacks discovered her tumor was depicted in a "pornographic" way.

In other media

Film

In 2010, it was announced that a television film project based on the book was in development. Oprah Winfrey and Alan Ball were teaming together to bring the biopic to HBO. HBO began production on the film in the summer of 2016. Winfrey executive-produced and starred as Deborah, the daughter of Henrietta Lacks. George C. Wolfe wrote the screenplay and directed the film. Lacks' sons and granddaughter were planned to serve as consultants. The film aired in 2017.

In Alex Garland's film Annihilation (2018), Natalie Portman's character is seen reading the book in one scene; her character is a biologist who specializes in cancer and the film explores genetic mutations.

See also
Crownsville Hospital Center, Elsie's asylum
Clover, Virginia, Henrietta's home town
Dundalk, Maryland, location of Turners Station in Baltimore

References

External links
The Immortal Life, authors official book website (audio/video, photos) 
Henrietta Lacks Foundation, non-profit org founded by Rebecca Skloot using proceeds from the book.
The Lacks Family, family website.
Excerpt from "The Immortal Life of Henrietta Lacks",  "Oprah Magazine, February 2010
The Immortal Life of Henrietta Lacks, The Sequel "New York Times" March 23, 2013
Your Cells. Their Research. Your Permission? "New York Times" Dec 30, 2015
The Way of All Flesh by Adam Curtis, 1997 BBC documentary discussed in the book.
 
Henrietta Everlasting: 1950s Cells Still Alive, Helping Science, Wired magazine, flowchart.
The Skloot Lacks Nothing, audio interview with Skloot, Dr. Kiki's Science Hour 43, TWiT.tv, April 23, 2010

2010 non-fiction books
Books about cancer
Non-fiction books adapted into films
Wellcome Book Prize
Crown Publishing Group books